Kann Thirandhu Paaramma ( Goddess, please open your eyes and watch) is a 2000 Tamil-language Hindu devotional film directed by L. C. Selva. The film stars Sangita and Ranjith, while Indhu and Vasu Vikram also appear in supporting roles. The film was released on 4 August 2000. The film was dubbed in Hindi as"Devi Tere Roop Anek".

Cast
Sangita as Gayatri and Amman
Ranjith
Indhu
Y. Vijaya
Babu Mohan
Mahanadhi Shankar
Vasu Vikram
Chaplin Balu
Mahendran
Ra. Sankaran

Production
United & Co, who worked as distributors for over 505 films, opted to make their first production through the film and opted to spend heavily on visual effects. The director, Selva, had previously apprenticed under K. Vijayan.

Soundtrack
Soundtrack was composed by newcomer S. P. Eeswar.
"Amman Solai"
"Unnai Thaane Amman Endru" (happy version) (Sujatha Mohan) 
"Unnai Thaane Amman Endru" (Sad version) (K. S. Chitra)

References

2000 films
2000s Tamil-language films
Indian drama films
Hindu devotional films